With Animals is the second collaborative studio album by American singer-songwriter Mark Lanegan and English multi-instrumentalist Duke Garwood. It was released on August 24, 2018 through Heavenly Recordings.

Critical reception
With Animals was met with "universal acclaim" reviews from critics. At Metacritic, which assigns a weighted average rating out of 100 to reviews from mainstream publications, this release received an average score of 82 based on 11 reviews. Aggregator Album of the Year gave the release a 76 out of 100 based on a critical consensus of 11 reviews.

Track listing

Charts

References

2018 albums
Heavenly Recordings albums
Mark Lanegan albums
Duke Garwood albums